was a town located in Sakata District, Shiga Prefecture, Japan.

As of 2003, the town had an estimated population of 12,212 and a density of 285.46 persons per km². The total area was 42.78 km².

On February 14, 2005, Maihara, along with the towns of Ibuki and Santō (all from Sakata District), was merged to create the city of Maibara.

It has developed as a traffic junction. In Edo period, there were Samegai-juku and Banba-juku. In Meiji period, a large station opened here, but it was named Maibara, not Maihara (see rendaku). So many Japanese mistook the town's name and the station's name. Eventually Maibara was adopted as the official name of new city.

References

Dissolved municipalities of Shiga Prefecture